The 1893 Drexel Dragons football team represented the Drexel Institute of Technology (renamed Drexel University in 1970) as an independent during the 1893 college football season.  The team did not have a head coach.

Schedule

Roster

References

Drexel
Drexel Dragons football seasons
Drexel Dragons football